Santa Ana Municipality is a municipality in Sonora in north-western Mexico.

The area of the municipality is 1,620.65 km2 and the population was 14,638 in 2005.

Seat: Santa Ana, Sonora

References

Municipalities of Sonora